Bābārahim Mashrab (Боборахим Машраб, Boborahim Mashrab) (1653-1711)  was a Sufi mystic, medieval scientist, significant Uzbek poet, a representative of mystical literature, and a famous name in Central Asian folklore.

Life
Babarahim Mullah Wali was born into a family of Mullah Wali, in the city of Namangan, Uzbekistan in 1653 AD. In 1665, at age 12, he went to the city of Kashgar to study under Afaq Khawaja. From 1673 to the end of his life he lived as a travelling mystic. He took the name Babarahim Mashrab as a pseudonym. He is credited with various miracles and the conversion to Islam of Galdan Boshugtu Khan of the Qalmaq empire. In 1711, he was hanged by  the governor of Balkh, Mahmud Bi.

He wrote in both Uzbek and Persian and his famous works “Mabdai nur” and “Kimyo” are still popular today in Central Asia.   He left a legacy in terms of size and genres of art that is still not defined, and he had a significant impact on the creation of the next century or so of literature.

Influence
Mashrab's hanging is mentioned in a poem written by Ghojimuhemmed Muhemmed, modern Uyghur poet from Pishan/Guma County, China.

External links 
 MEŞREB, Baba Rahîm in Türk Edebiyatı İsimler Sözlüğü (in Turkish)

References

Uzbekistani poets
1653 births
1711 deaths
People from Namangan Region
Uzbekistani male poets
Turkic literature
Uzbek-language literature
Uzbekistani literature
Persian-language poets
Sufis